The Short and Tragic Life of Robert Peace is a biography by Jeff Hobbs about an intellectually brilliant young African-American man, Robert DeShaun Peace (June 25, 1980 – May 18, 2011), who left Newark, New Jersey to attend Yale University, but fell back into the streets when he returned to Newark and was murdered, aged 30, "face down, knees bent", in a drug-related shooting.

Early life
Born to Jackie Peace and Robert Douglas, Robert Peace grew up in East Orange, New Jersey, which borders Newark. His parents didn't live together, and his father sold drugs. Rob's father was involved in his son's life, but Rob lived with his mother and her family. His mother worked long hours at low-paying jobs and sacrificed to send Peace to St. Benedict's Preparatory School, a private middle and high school. When Rob was seven, his father was arrested and charged with murder, convicted, and sent to prison. Rob visited him often in prison until his father's death there, when Rob was in his mid-20s.

Yale University
After high school, Peace was sponsored by Charles Cawley, a bank executive, to attend Yale University, where he majored in molecular biophysics and biochemistry, and worked in a cancer and infectious disease laboratory. While at Yale, Peace earned over $100,000 selling marijuana. Peace graduated in 2002, with honors. One of his roommates was Jeff Hobbs, the author of Peace's biography.

Rob Peace (film)
A film adaptation of Peace's story is currently filming in Newark, New Jersey as of 2023. Rob Peace is written and directed by Chiwetel Ejiofor with a cast including Ejiofor, Mary J. Blige and Michael Kelly.

Career
After graduation from Yale, Peace taught biology for four years at the Catholic high school he had attended even as he expanded his marijuana marketing and personal use of marijuana, alcohol and possibly other drugs. He then worked for low wages at a major airline and traveled often.

Awards

 Runner up for the 2015 Dayton Literary Peace Prize for Nonfiction
 Los Angeles Times Book Prize for Current Interest in 2014

References

2014 non-fiction books
Biographies about African-American people
Yale University
Culture of Newark, New Jersey
Peace, Robert
Peace, Robert
Charles Scribner's Sons books